Fanning is a surname of Irish origin. Notable people with the surname include:

 Bede Fanning (1885–1970), Australian public servant
 Bernard Fanning (born 1969), Australian musician, best known for his role as the lead singer of the Australian rock band Powderfinger
 Buist M. Fanning (born 1949), American biblical Greek scholar
 Dakota Fanning (born 1994), American actress and older sister of Elle
 Dave Fanning, Irish television and radio host
 Edmund Fanning (1769–1841), American explorer
 Edmund Fanning (colonial administrator) (1739–1818), American-born administrator for the British government in New York and Loyalist; later a governor in Canada
 Elle Fanning (born 1998), American actress and younger sister of Dakota
 Ellen Fanning, Australian TV journalist
 Eric Kenneth Fanning (born 1968), United States Secretary of the Army
 Fred Fanning (1921–1993), Australian rules footballer
 Jim Fanning (1927–2015), catcher, manager and front office executive in Major League Baseball
 Jimmy Valiant (born James Harold Fanning, 1942), American retired professional wrestler
 Juan Fanning (1824–1881), Peruvian naval officer and war hero
 Kay Fanning (1927–2000), American newspaper editor and publisher, first American woman to edit a national newspaper
 Ken Fanning (born 1947), American wilderness guide and retired politician
 Mick Fanning (born 1981), Australian professional surfer
 Mike Fanning (American football) (1953–2022), American football player
 Nathaniel Fanning (1755–1804), American naval officer and war hero
 Ronan Fanning (1941–2017), Irish historian
 Shawn Fanning (born 1980), computer programmer and creator of the original Napster application
 Thomas A. Fanning (a.k.a. Tom Fanning), American chief executive.
 Vincent Fanning, Irish, first manager of Cork Airport (1961).

References

Surnames of Irish origin
English-language surnames
Anglicised Irish-language surnames